Dani Romain is a Canadian screenwriter and television producer, who has been writing and producing partner of George F. Walker in the television series This Is Wonderland, The Line and Living in Your Car, and the film Niagara Motel. A native of South Africa, she has lived in Canada since 1986.

References

External links

21st-century Canadian screenwriters
Canadian television producers
Canadian women television producers
Living people
Year of birth missing (living people)
Canadian women screenwriters
South African emigrants to Canada
Canadian television writers
Canadian women television writers
21st-century Canadian women writers